Bashtin (also Romanized as Bāshtīn; also known as Sarbedār) is a village in Bashtin Rural District, Bashtin District, Davarzan County, Razavi Khorasan Province, Iran. At the 2006 census, its population was 953, in 281 families.

References 

Populated places in Davarzan County